Todd Steven Luikart (born 1971) is an American fantasy author, poet and roleplaying game designer.

Personal life
TS Luikart was born in San Diego, California in 1971. He attended the University of California, Santa Cruz, graduating with a B.A. in Literature in 1994.

Career

Roleplaying games
Game design work by Luikart for Green Ronin includes Red Star Campaign Setting, Skull & Bones, Mutants & Masterminds, and Dragon Age. In 2015, Luikart joined the creative team of Cubicle 7.

Among Luikart's oeuvre are the following games which he has either designed or contributed writing to:

From Black Industries, for the 2nd edition of the Warhammer Fantasy Roleplay game;
 Realms of Sorcery
 Old World Bestiary
 Terror in Talabheim

From Green Ronin Publishing, for the d20 system;
 Skull and Bones
 The Red Star Campaign Setting
 Nocturnals: A Midnight Companion for the Mutants and Masterminds game system.

For Cubicle 7:

Luikart contributed to much of The One Ring Roleplaying Game and was one of the lead designers of The Adventures in Middle-Earth Roleplaying Game. TS helped design the 4th edition of Warhammer Fantasy Roleplaying, working on multiple titles of the line. TS is said to be one of the lead designers of the Warhammer Age of Sigmar Roleplaying Game, Soulbound, along with the 40K RPG Wrath & Glory, and the forth coming Imperial Maledictum.

Luikart also worked on the Underworld game, which is no longer in publication.

Poet and writer
His interests are primarily in the fantasy and science fiction genres in his larger works of fiction, though he is not limited to these genres. He has also been known to write poetry on a wide range of subjects. He has included a number of short stories in his RPG work (see links above) as well as publishing some short work online.  He has additionally done some writing on the theory of roleplaying in Daedalus, an online journal.

Honors
Luikart was selected as an Industry Insider Guest of Honor for GenCon in 2012 alongside Gareth-Michael Skarka.

References

External links
 T. S. Luikart :: Pen & Paper RPG Database archive

1971 births
Living people
Poets from California
Role-playing game designers
University of California, Santa Cruz alumni
Warhammer Fantasy Roleplay game designers
Writers from San Diego